Where Legends Dwell is an album by American pianist Joanne Brackeen recorded in 1991 and released on the Ken Music label.

Reception 

The Penguin Guide to Jazz noted "Brackeen's fine balance of abstraction and straightforward melody is simply demonstrated on Where Legends Dwell."
AllMusic reviewer Michael G. Nastos stated "this is her best work of the past decade. Twelve tracks are all originals. Over 70 minutes of incredibly ingenious jazz included. This is easy to dig into".

Track listing 
All compositions by Joanne Brackeen.

 "Where Legends Dwell" – 6:30
 "Oahu Lizard" – 6:47
 "Picasso" – 8:42
 "Helen Song" – 6:09
 "Cosmic Ties and Mud Pies" – 2:46
 "Doris and Anders" – 6:10
 "Edgar Irving Poe" – 6:11
 "For Stan" – 6:10
 "Can This McBee?" – 5:08
 "Asian Spell" – 7:09
 "Jump in Jack" – 4:42
 "How to Think Like a Millionaire" – 3:55

Personnel 
Joanne Brackeen – piano
Eddie Gómez – bass
Jack DeJohnette – drums

References 

Joanne Brackeen albums
1992 albums
Ken Music Records albums